Ycliff is a railway point and unincorporated place in Unorganized Kenora District in northwestern Ontario, Canada.

It lies on the Canadian National Railway transcontinental main line, between Robinson to the west and Fowler to the east, has a passing track, and is passed but not served by Via Rail transcontinental Canadian trains.

References

Communities in Kenora District